Las Tinajas ("the small pools") is a village located in the municipality of Zinapécuaro, in the central Mexican state of Michoacán. As of 2010, the village had a population of 19. The Las Tinajas massacre took place in this village.

References

Populated places in Michoacán